Erath County is a county located in the U.S. state of Texas. According to the United States Census bureau its population was 42,545 in 2020. The county seat is Stephenville. The county is named for George Bernard Erath, an early surveyor and a soldier at the Battle of San Jacinto.

Erath County is included in the Stephenville, Texas, Micropolitan Statistical Area.

Erath County is the location of two of North America's largest renewable natural gas plants. The largest is at Huckabay Ridge, near Stephenville. The second largest is located outside Dublin at Rio Leche Estates.

History

Native Americans
Caddo tribe Anadarko villages were scattered along the Trinity and Brazos Rivers. French explorer Jean-Baptiste Bénard de la Harpe developed camaraderie among the Anadarko in 1719 when he established Fort Saint Louis de los Cadodaquious. The Anadarko became entangled with the French battles with the Spanish and later the Anglos and suffered the consequences, including diseases from which they had no immunity. By 1860, these tribes moved to Oklahoma. Erath County falls into Comancheria and found itself raided by Comanches until their removal to Oklahoma after 1875.

County established and growth
Erath County was formed from Bosque and Coryell counties in 1856 and named for George Bernard Erath, one of the original surveyors of the area. In 1856, John M. Stephen offered to donate land for a townsite. It was named Stephenville after him and became the county seat.

Jones Barbee founded the community of Dublin in 1854. His children were the first citizens to be buried in Erath County in the community of Edna Hill, which is located in Southern Erath. Barbee  Cemetery is named after him. Jones traveled with his wife and children across the country coming from North Carolina. He is the grandson of Christopher "Old Kit" Barbee who was the largest wealthiest landowner in North Carolina. He was the largest land donor for the University of North Carolina at Chapel Hill. Barbee served as board president; a bronze statue of him is in the university. Jones had many children who went on to populate the county with names still enduring today such as Barbee, White, Durham, and Brambeletts. Some of his great-grandchildren still reside in the community. His great-great-great-granddaughter, Carolina, lives on his land today in Edna Hill and is the 6th generation to continually live on his old homestead. Her children are the 7th generation to do so. The families of other early settlers still endure there today. 
Dublin later became famous as the early boyhood home of the PGA, U.S. Open and Masters golf champion Ben Hogan.

In 1855, thirty pioneers settled in the county led by  surveyors George Erath (1813–1891) and Neil McLennan. The group included brothers William F. and John M. Stephen and a black family whose name and destiny is unknown.

Erath, an immigrant from Vienna, Austria, was a Texas Ranger and member of Billingsley's Company C, 1st Regiment of Texas Volunteers, under the command of Col. Charles Burleson at the Battle of San Jacinto, and a member of the Confederate Home Guard. As a Freemason, he was a charter member and secretary of Bosque Lodge #92, from 1852 to 1855which changed its name to Waco #92 in 1857 and remains the oldest continuous organization in Waco, Texas.

Cotton became the major crop between 1875 and 1915, with the largest crop being in 1906. The industry was helped in 1879 when the Texas Central Railroad reached Dublin, and in 1889 when the Fort Worth and Rio Grande railroad  was completed through Stephenville. This opened eastern markets for the county's cotton crops. By 1910, soil erosion and the boll weevil caused diversity planning that led to dairy farms, fruit orchards, nurseries, peanuts, feed crops and poultry.

The community of Thurber was created by the Johnson Coal Company. From 1888 to 1921, the Texas Pacific Coal Company mined coal near Thurber, making it a leading coal producer in the state. Fifty-two percent of the miners were of Italian ancestry, creating the "Italian Hill" community just outside Thurber. The United Mine Workers in 1903 sent Joe Fenoglio to organize the Italian workers, thus beginning the Thurber Coal Miners Strike. In the 1970s, the area began bituminous coal production for fuel in the cement industry.

Tarleton State University was founded in 1893 as Stephenville College but was renamed in 1899 after the local rancher John Tarleton rescued the institution from financial difficulties.

On November 4, 2008, Erath County voters elected to allow the sale of beer and wine in the county for off-premises consumption.

Courthouse
Erath's original 1866 wooden courthouse burned to the ground, destroying county documents along with it. A second stone courthouse was built in 1877 but eventually razed. The cornerstone for the current courthouse was laid in 1891. The architects James Riely Gordon and D. E. Laub designed the present three-story showcase Victorian structure. In addition to Erath, Gordon designed the Arizona State Capitol, and courthouses in Aransas, Bexar, Brazoria, Comal, Ellis, Fayette, Gonzales, Harrison, Hopkins, Lee, McLennan, Victoria and Wise counties. The building was completed in 1893, with limestone from the Leon River and red sandstone from Pecos County. The building's centralized 95-foot tower has a bell tower and creates a chandeliered atrium from the first floor to the third. The interior is east Texas pine, with cast and wrought-iron stairways, and tessellated imported marble floors. It was renovated in 1988.

Geography

Major highways

  Interstate 20
  U.S. Highway 67
  U.S. Highway 281
  U.S. Highway 377
  State Highway 6
  State Highway 108

Adjacent counties
 Palo Pinto County (north)
 Hood County (northeast)
 Somervell County (east)
 Bosque County (southeast)
 Hamilton County (south)
 Comanche County (southwest)
 Eastland County (west)

Demographics

Note: the US Census treats Hispanic/Latino as an ethnic category. This table excludes Latinos from the racial categories and assigns them to a separate category. Hispanics/Latinos can be of any race.

At the 2010 census, there were 37,890 people, 14,569 households and 9,003 families residing in the county. The racial makeup of the county was 85.6% White, 1.2% Black or African American, 0.8% Native American, 0.7% Asian, 0.0003% Pacific Islander, 10% from other races, and 1.7% from two or more races. 19.2% of the population were Hispanic or Latino of any race.

There were 14,569 households, of which 29.59% had children under the age of 18 living with them, 49.03% were married couples living together, 14.7% had a female householder with no husband present and 38.2% were non-families. 27% of all households were made up of individuals. The average household size was 2.47 and the average family size was 3.06.

22.29% of the population were under the age of 18, 19.40% from 18 to 24, 23.10% from 25 to 44, 22.60% from 45 to 64, and 12.60% who were 65 years of age or older. The median age was 30.5 years. For every 100 females there were 96.50 males.

Communities

Cities
 Dublin
 Stephenville (county seat)

Unincorporated communities

 Alexander
 Bluff Dale
 Chalk Mountain
 Clairette
 Edna Hill
 Harbin
 Huckabay
 Lingleville
 Morgan Mill
 Oak Dale
 Purves
 Selden
 Three Way
 Thurber

Ghost town
 Duffau

Politics
Erath County is heavily Republican. In 2012, Mitt Romney won the county in the presidential election, taking over 80% of the vote. The last Democrat to win the county was Jimmy Carter in 1980.

Media
Two newspapers have offices located in Erath County: The Stephenville Empire-Tribune and The Dublin Citizen. Local television stations that provide coverage for Erath County and surrounding areas come from the Dallas/Fort Worth and Waco/Temple/Killeen metropolitan areas.

Five radio stations have their main studios and offices in Erath County: KEQX 89.5, KTRL 90.5, KSTV-FM 93.1, KXTR-LP 100.7 and KSTV (AM) 1510. KTRL and KXTR-LP are operated by Tarleton State University.

In popular culture 
Several scenes in the Paul Greengrass Western movie News of the World starring Tom Hanks take place in a fictionalized Erath County shortly after the end of the Civil War.

See also

 List of museums in North Texas
 National Register of Historic Places listings in Erath County, Texas
 Recorded Texas Historic Landmarks in Erath County
 Three Way Independent School District

References

External links

 Erath County
 Erath County in Handbook of Texas Online at the University of Texas
 Entry for George B. Erath from the Biographical Encyclopedia of Texas published 1880, hosted by the Portal to Texas History.

 
1856 establishments in Texas
Populated places established in 1856